Gazi, Gaji or ghazi may refer to:

 A gazi or ghāzī is a frontier warrior in Islam.

People
 Gazi or Ghazi is also used as an honorific Muslim and specifically Ottoman title that appears in the names of many historic figures, notably:
 Gazi Saiyyed Salar Sahu (early 11th century), army commander of Mahmad Ghaznavi
 Gazi Evrenos (1288–1417) 
 Osman al-Ghazi (1299–1326)
 Gazi Pir (12th or 13th century), Bengali Muslim saint
 Gazi Chelebi (14th century), pirate and ruler of Sinop, Turkey
 Gazi-Husrev Beg, a Bosnian bey (1480–1541)
 Gazi Osman Pasha (1832–1897), Ottoman field marshal 
 "The Gazi" is also used to refer to Mustafa Kemal Atatürk (1881–1938), the founder of the Republic of Turkey
 Mahmut Gazi Yasargil (born 1925), Turkish medical scientist and neurosurgeon
 Gazi Mazharul Anwar, Bangladeshi film director, producer, lyricist, screenwriter, freedom fighter and music director

Places
 Gazi, Athens, a neighbourhood in Athens, Greece
 Gazi, Crete, a town in Greece
 Gazi, Hormozgan, a village in Hormozgan Province, Iran
 Gazi, Istanbul, a neighborhood in Istanbul, Turkey
 Gazi, North Khorasan, a village in North Khorasan Province, Iran
 Gazi, Razavi Khorasan, a village in Razavi Khorasan Province, Iran
 Gazi, Sistan and Baluchestan, a village in Sistan and Baluchestan Province, Iran
 Gaziantep, a city in Turkey

Other uses
 Gazi University, a university in Ankara, Turkey
 Gazi Thesis, a historiographical thesis used to explain the rise of the Ottoman Empire

See also
Ghazi (disambiguation)
Kazi (disambiguation)
Kasi (disambiguation)
Razzia (military)